Ratko Janev (March 30, 1939 – December 31, 2019) was a Yugoslav and Serbian atomic physicist and Macedonian academician.

Biography
Janev was born on March 30, 1939 in Sveti Vrach, Bulgaria. During his youth he moved to Yugoslavia, where he graduated from a high school in Skopje in 1957 and then went on to study at the University of Belgrade, where he received a PhD degree in 1968. From 1965 he was an associate of the Vinča Nuclear Institute. From 1986 he was Head of the Atomic and Molecular Unit in the Nuclear Data Section of the International Atomic Energy Agency in Vienna.

In 1972, Janev became Adjunct Professor of Nuclear Physics at the University of Skopje and Professor of Theoretical Physics at the University of Belgrade. Between 2002 and 2004 he worked at the Department of Plasma Physics in Jülich Research Centre, Germany.

Janev was a member of the Macedonian Academy of Sciences and Arts. In 2004 he received the Research Award from the Alexander von Humboldt Foundation for the project "Modelling and Diagnostics of Fusion Edge/Diverter Plasma" on the understanding of cold boundary layer plasmas in nuclear fusion reactors, performed in collaboration with the Research Centre.

Publications 
 
 
 
 
 
 
 
"Atomska fizika" (Atomic physics), 1972

"Atomska fizika" (Atomic physics), MANU, Skopje, 2012.
Atomic_and_plasma_material_interaction https://books.google.com/books/about/Atomic_and_plasma_material_interaction_p.html?id=rSNRAAAAMAAJ&redir_esc=y
Collision Processes of Hydrocarbon Species in Hydrogen Plasmas https://www.amazon.co.uk/Collision-Processes-Hydrocarbon-Species-Hydrogen/dp/B0019T6NK2/ref=sr_1_2?s=books&ie=UTF8&qid=1349889726&sr=1-2

Notes

References 
Enciklopedija Jugoslavije, 2nd Ed, Volume 5

External links 

1939 births
2019 deaths
Theoretical physicists
Quantum physicists
Macedonian nuclear physicists
People from Sandanski
Bulgarian emigrants to Yugoslavia
Academic staff of the University of Belgrade
Yugoslav physicists
21st-century physicists
Plasma physicists